Gloria of Thurn and Taxis (Mariae Gloria Ferdinanda Joachima Josephine Wilhelmine Huberta; born Countess Gloria von Schönburg-Glauchau, 23 February 1960) is a German socialite, businesswoman, Catholic activist, and artist. Through her marriage to Johannes, 11th Prince of Thurn and Taxis, she became the Princess Consort of Thurn und Taxis.

Early life and family
Countess Gloria von Schönburg-Glauchau was born on 23 February 1960 in Stuttgart, Baden-Württemberg, West Germany. Her father, Joachim, Count of Schönburg-Glauchau, was the nominal head of the Glauchau branch of the German princely House of Schönburg, a mediatised dynasty within the former Holy Roman Empire. Her mother, Countess Beatrix Széchenyi de Sárvár-Felsővidék, was a member of the Hungarian nobility and a descendant of Count István Széchenyi. Her parents divorced in 1986 and her father married a second time to Ursula Zwicker. Gloria is one of five children from her father's two marriages. She has 2 brothers, Carl-Alban Count von Schönburg-Glauchau (born 2 February 1966), formerly head of the family who renounced his rights after his marriage to Juliet Helene Beechy-Fowler, daughter of Nicholas Beechy-Fowler and Countess Jutta von Pfeil und Klein-Ellguth. Her younger brother Alexander, Count of Schönburg-Glauchau, a writer and the current nominal head of the Schönburg-Glauchau branch of the family is married according to the rules of the house to Princess Irina of Hesse, grandniece of Prince Philip, Duke of Edinburgh, consort of Queen Elizabeth II. One of her sisters was the socialite Countess Maya von Schönburg-Glauchau. Gloria was baptized as an infant and raised in the Catholic faith.

Childhood and adolescence 
When she was a child, Gloria and her family moved to Africa, living in Togo and Somalia, where her father worked as an author and a journalist. Although a descendant of the German nobility, her family had little wealth as a result of Communism in Germany and Hungary. Her family's ancestral homes, castles Wechselburg, Hinterglauchau, Forderglauchau, Rochsburg, Alt-Penig and Neu-Penig had been seized by the Soviet government of Saxony in 1945. She moved back to Germany with her family in 1970 and was enrolled at the Konrad-Adenauer-Gymnasium in Meckenheim, later studying at Kloster Wald, a girl's boarding school in a Benedictine convent. As a teenager she worked as a waitress at a ski resort in St Moritz, Switzerland.

Marriage and issue 
In 1979, at the age of 19, Gloria met Johannes, Hereditary Prince of Thurn and Taxis at a luncheon he was hosting at Nürnberger Bratwurst Glöckl in Munich. She began a relationship with the 53 year old man soon after and married on 31 May 1980 in a Catholic ceremony in Regensburg, Bavaria. At the time of their marriage Johannes was estimated to be worth between US$2 and US$3 billion. Gloria and her husband are fourth cousins twice removed, both descending from Karl Alexander, 5th Prince of Thurn and Taxis. Upon their marriage she became the Hereditary Princess of Thurn and Taxis. When her father-in-law, Karl August, 10th Prince of Thurn and Taxis, died in 1982 her husband became the 11th Prince of Thurn and Taxis.

The couple had three children:
 Princess Maria Theresia Ludowika Klothilde Helene Alexandra, born 28 November 1980 in Regensburg. On 13 September 2014, she married Hugo Wilson, a British artist, in Tutzing, Germany. They have two daughters.
 Princess Elisabeth Margarete Maria Anna Beatrix, born 24 March 1982 in Regensburg.
 Prince Albert Maria Lamoral Miguel Johannes Gabriel, born 24 June 1983 in Regensburg, who succeeded his father in 1990 as both principal heir at law and nominal head of the former German princely House of Thurn and Taxis according to the traditional rules of the legal affairs committee of the Association of German Nobility.

Later life 
Gloria and her husband were known for their lavish lifestyle, becoming social and fashion icons in the 1980s. She became part of the European jet set and was referred to in the media as the "punk princess" and "Princess TNT".

When her husband died in 1990, Gloria was left to settle his debts, which totaled at US$500 million. Her son, Albert, became the 12th Prince of Thurn and Taxis at the time of Johannes' death. She acted as the trustee for Albert, taking over management of the family estate, Saint Emmeram's Abbey. She went into isolation from society, studying finance, accounting, and estate management. She sold off family property including art, jewelry, castles, cars, and land to preserve the family fortune. During this time she undertook a spiritual pilgrimage to the Sanctuary of Our Lady of Lourdes in Lourdes, France, emerging as a Roman Catholic activist.

In 2001 Gloria was severely criticized for stating on a talk show that the high rate of AIDS in African countries was due not to a lack of safe sex practices but to the fact that "the blacks like to copulate ('schnackseln') a lot". In 2008 she said in an interview that Africans have a lot of sex because of Africa's higher temperatures.

Gloria accompanied her sister, Maya, on pilgrimages to Lourdes and Santiago de Compostela Cathedral in Spain after Maya was diagnosed with lung cancer in 2012.

Gloria has become a successful artist, focusing mainly on portraits done with oil paint and pastel. The Hotel Chelsea asked her to do a series of pastels of its most famous denizens—a gallery show which brought her much acclaim as a painter. She has referred to herself as a "dilettante", and cites her art collection as inspiration for her contemporary style of portraiture. In 2015 she had a solo show at the National Exemplar Gallery in New York. She also paints freelance.

In January 2019 the El Museo del Barrio in Manhattan decided to cancel an upcoming exhibition of Gloria's work at their 50th anniversary gala due to her right wing political stances and comments she had made about race and AIDS.

A devout Catholic, Gloria works closely with conservative Traditionalist Catholic leaders including Archbishop Carlo Maria Viganò, Cardinal Raymond Burke, Monsignor Wilhelm Imkamp, and Steve Bannon. Her palatial home, Schloss Thurn und Taxis was suggested by Bannon as a potential site for a school to educate and train right-wing Catholics, although no firm plans have been made.

Gloria is a personal friend of Hillary Clinton, and was one of a dozen women to attend her 2016 birthday party.

Honours
Hereditary titles are only recognised in German law as part of the surname in accordance with the Weimar Constitution of 1919. Members of the Thurn and Taxis family include the title as an integral part of their surname in the form, Prinz/essin von Thurn und Taxis.

Dynastic
  Dame Grand Cross of the Order of Perfect Friendship (House of Thurn und Taxis)
  Dame of the Imperial and Royal Order of the Starry Cross, 1st Class (Austrian Imperial and Royal Family)

National
  Officer of the Order of Merit of the Federal Republic of Germany (Germany)
  Commander of the Bavarian Order of Merit (Bavaria)

Foreign
  Dame Commander with Star of the Order of St. Gregory the Great (Holy See)
  Dame Grand Cross of Honour and Devotion of the Sovereign Military Order of Malta (Sovereign Military Order of Malta)

Ancestry

Notable published works 
 Unsere Umgangsformen. Die Welt der guten Sitten von A-Z - with Princess Alessandra Borghese - (2000).  
 Gloria: Die Fürstin - Im Gespräch mit Peter Seewald (2005). 
 Die Fürstin und der Kardinal - with Cardinal Joachim Meisner - (2008).

References

External links

 The Princely House of Thurn and Taxis

Living people
1960 births
21st-century German painters
21st-century German women artists
Dames Commander with Star of the Order of St. Gregory the Great
Dames of Malta
German countesses
German philanthropists
German portrait painters
German landowners
German Roman Catholics
German socialites
German traditionalist Catholics 
German women painters
Hereditary Princesses of Thurn and Taxis
House of Schönburg-Glauchau
Officers Crosses of the Order of Merit of the Federal Republic of Germany
Artists from Stuttgart
Princesses by marriage
Princesses of Thurn und Taxis
Roman Catholic activists
Széchenyi family
German women philanthropists
Women art collectors